David Gross is a Canadian film producer who has served as a key member in the company No Trace Camping, and as president of David Gross Productions Inc., based in Ontario.

Gross is from Toronto, and graduated from the American Film Institute in 2007. With Jesse Shapira finding the book Goon: The True Story of an Unlikely Journey Into a Minor Hockey League and envisioning a film adaptation, Shapira, Gross and No Trace Camping partners co-produced the 2011 film Goon. David Gross Productions Inc. later co-produced The F Word (2013) and Room (2015). Gross advocated for keeping the title The F Word for its Canadian release, although the Motion Picture Association of America found issues with it.

With Room, Gross persuaded his Irish co-producers to shoot in Canada rather than the United States, saying they could have a longer schedule and more money in Canada. He accepted the Canadian Screen Award for Best Motion Picture for Room in 2016.

References

External links
 

AFI Conservatory alumni
Year of birth missing (living people)
Film producers from Ontario
Canadian Screen Award winners
Living people
People from Toronto